Chaplain (Major General) Orris Eugene Kelly, USA (born July 28, 1926) is a retired American Army officer who served as the 14th Chief of Chaplains of the United States Army from 1975 to 1979.

Early life
Kelly was born in 1926 in Montrose, Kansas to Herman Albertis (H.A.) "Bert" Kelly and Theodora Viola Pacaková, the daughter of Czech immigrants from the Austro-Hungarian Empire.

He attended elementary and high school in Montrose.

World War II
In January 1944, he entered the Army Specialized Training Program to attend the University of Kansas where he hoped to become a civil engineer. In August 1944, he was sent to basic training at Camp Fannin, Texas, and then to Officer Candidate School at Fort Benning, Georgia. He was commissioned a second lieutenant, Infantry, Class 452, on May 29, 1945.

He served at Camp Shelby, Mississippi; Fort Hood, Texas; Camp Callan, California; Camp San Luis Obispo, California; and in the Army of Occupation in Germany. His experiences in the ruins of Dresden as an officer in the military police made him change his goal of becoming an engineer into becoming a chaplain. He left the service in 1946 as a first lieutenant to resume college.

Interwar years

Reverend Kelly completed his AB degree at Kansas Wesleyan University, Salina, Kansas in 1950 and graduated with a Bachelor of Divinity degree from the Garrett Theological Seminary (Northwestern University), Evanston, Illinois, in 1953. He was ordained as a Methodist clergyman in June 1953.

Second military tour
Immediately after ordination, he entered on active duty at Fort Leonard Wood, Missouri. He served with the 398th Engineer Construction Battalion as housing area pastor during his first year. In 1954, he was assigned to the 8th Cavalry Regiment of the First Cavalry Division in Japan for three years, where he adopted several Japanese orphans along with his wife Phyllis Goodenow-Kelly. After returning to the United States, Reverend Kelly was stationed at Fort Riley, Kansas, from 1957 to 1961. During this period, he attended the Associate Command and General Staff College, graduating in 1959. In 1961, he was assigned to an overseas replacement battle group and transferred to the Seventh Infantry Division in Korea

From 1962 to 1966, he served on the staff of the US Army Chaplain School, Fort Hamilton, New York. During the period from 1966 to 1969, he was assigned as Director, US Forces Religious Retreat Center, Berchtesgaden, Germany. In 1969, he was transferred to Vietnam in July to serve as Division Chaplain of the Fourth Infantry Division at Pleiku and An Khe. Reverend Kelly joined the staff of the Office Chief of Chaplains in 1970, serving first as an action officer in Plans, Programs and Policies Directorate, and later as Director.

In 1972, he was selected to attend the Army War College, the highest level of military education in the Department of the Army. Concurrent with his studies at the War College, he received a Master of Science degree in Counseling from Shippensburg State College, Shippensburg, Pennsylvania.

Returning to Washington in 1973, he was assigned to the Office of the Chief of Chaplains as Executive Officer, a position he held until July 31, 1975.

On April 7, 1975, Reverend Kelly was nominated by President Ford for the appointment as Chief of Chaplains, Department of the Army, with promotion from lieutenant colonel to major general. The Senate confirmed the nomination on April 29, 1975, and promotion ceremonies were conducted on August 1, 1975, by General Walter T. Kerwin, Jr., Vice Chief of Staff of the United States Army.

Reverend Kelly retired from the Army on July 1, 1979.

Post-army life
On August 1, 1979 he assumed the position of Associate General Secretary for the Division of Chaplains and Related Ministries (DCRM). This is an organization part of the Board of Higher Education and Ministry of the United Methodist Church. During his association with DCRM, he became acquainted with the President of the Hospital Corporation of America, who asked him to become the Vice President of Pastoral Service with the responsibility for developing pastoral care programs in the 480 hospital HCA system. He assumed this position in 1985.

Awards and decorations

References

Further reading

1926 births
Living people
United States Army generals
Chiefs of Chaplains of the United States Army
United States Army personnel of World War II
United States Army personnel of the Korean War
Korean War chaplains
United States Army personnel of the Vietnam War
Vietnam War chaplains
Recipients of the Distinguished Service Medal (US Army)
Recipients of the Legion of Merit
Recipients of the Air Medal
People from Jewell County, Kansas
Kansas Wesleyan University alumni
Burials at Arlington National Cemetery
20th-century American clergy